Martel is a commune in the Lot department in southwestern France. It is a small medieval town in a region well known for its walnuts and truffles.

History
The name of the town means "hammer", and three of these are to be seen on the town's coat of arms. Charles Martel, who earned the nickname "hammer" after his victory in the Battle of Tours in 732, is said to have founded the town. Henry the Young King died here in 1183. In 1219, the town received its charter and was a fiefdom of the Viscounts of Turenne.

Geography
To the north lies the commune of Cazillac, to the northeast Strenquels, to the east Saint-Denis-lès-Martel, to the southeast Floirac, to the south Montvalent, to the southwest Creysse, to the west Baladou and to the northwest Cuzance.

The countryside is rural with rolling hills, pastureland and the cultivation of walnuts. North of the town lies the elevated limestone plateau of Causse de Martel, much of which is covered with oak and beech woodland.

The town

Martel is a medieval town, with the older houses built of pale stone that contrasts with their reddish-brown roofs. The ramparts that used to surround the town are gone but in their place is a wide boulevard and the narrow-streeted central part is a pedestrian area. The town has a distinctive sky-line with medieval towers projecting above the houses, and because of these, the town is sometimes called La ville aux sept tours. The highest tower is that of the Church of Saint-Maur.

There is an eighteenth-century market hall taking up most of the central cobbled square. Markets are held here on Wednesdays and Saturdays, and during late December or January there is an annual truffle market.

In July, the  Foire à la Laine (Wool Fair) is held underneath the market hall, with competitions for the best fleeces.  There is a museum containing items from Puy d'Issolud, a local Gallic archaeological site which has been identified as Uxellodunum, besieged by Julius Caesar in 51 BC.

Notable people
 

Claudius Cayx-Dumas (1724–1792), French Jesuit.
Jean Pierre Serrier (1934-1989), French artist, opened the gallery La Licorne in 1967.

See also
Communes of the Lot department

References

External links

Communes of Lot (department)
Quercy